Bijoy Kumar Hrangkhawl is the current president of The Indigenous Progressive Regional Alliance or TIPRA. He was the leader of the Indigenous Nationalist Party of Twipra, a political party based in the Indian state of Tripura.

Early life

Marriage and family
After finishing school in Shillong, Bijoy Kumar Hrangkhawl married Linda Hrangkhawl. The couple had a son Borkung Hrangkhawl. Borkung is now a popular singer-songwriter who is celebrated across Northeast India.
I don't deny that Linda (his wife) influenced my decision to surrender...I have no hesitation to admit that she alone was 25 per cent responsible for this (the Tripura) accord.

Bijoy Kumar Hrangkhawl, TNV chief, in The Week

Tripuri Nationalism leadership between 1978–1988 

Hrangkhawl began his political career as an organising secretary in the ethno-nationalist Tripura Upajati Juba Samiti. He became the leader of the Tripuri Sena, the militant wing of TUJS. Tripuri Sena was formed following the Left Front victory in 1977, and it engaged in physical combat against the left. Tripuri Sena soon evolved into the Tripura National Volunteers.

For ten years, 1978–1988, Hrangkhawl led an armed struggle as the supremo of the TNV, which sought to expel the Bengali majority from Tripura. TNV soon became infamous for their campaign of ethnic cleansing in the rural areas of Tripura. In 1983 he expressed the political ambitions of TNV in the following words in a letter to the then Prime Minister, Indira Gandhi:

Armed insurgency was necessary to reach your heart. Either you deport all foreign nationals who infiltrated into Tripura after 15 October 1947 or settle them anywhere in India other than Tripura... We demand a free Tripura.

In 1988 TNV signed a peace treaty, and TNV was converted into a political party.

TNV later merged with INPT.

Political career 
After signing the TNV Accord in 1988, Bijoy Hrangkhawl joined mainstream politics with The Indigenous Nationalist Party of Twipra (INPT). He oversaw the implementation of the agreement like the reservervation of three more seats for the Indigenous people in Tripura Assembly.

After the 1998 Tripura Assembly Election, Bijoy Kumar Hrangkhawl became a Member of Legislative Assembly for the first time from Kulai Constituency. He contested the state election as an Independent candidate.

Further reading 

 Rites of Passage: Border Corssisngs, Imagined Homelands, India's East and Bangladesh by Sanjoy Hazarika
 Along the Red River By Sabita Goswami
Peace Accords in Northeast India: Journey Over Milestones by Swarna Rajagopalam
Lost Opportunities: 50 Years of Insurgency in the North-east and India's Response by S.P. Sinha

References 

Tripura politicians
Living people
Tripuri nationalism
Indigenous Nationalist Party of Twipra politicians
1946 births